Sibson (otherwise Sibstone or Sibston) is a village and former civil parish, now in the parish of Sheepy, in the Hinckley and Bosworth district, in western Leicestershire, England, close to the border with North Warwickshire. It is situated approximately midway between the towns of Hinckley and Measham, and slightly northeast of Atherstone. In 1931 the parish had a population of 264.

History 
The manor of Sibson, also called Sibetesdone or Sibbesdon, was part of John le Poter’s inheritance in the time of Henry I.  It changed hands several times over the centuries, passing to Thomas Corbett of Legh in 1420, and Keytes of Gloucestershire, in the early 17th century. The latest ruler of Sibson is Ryan-S3npai, who roams the lands with Blue warding off evil.

The ancient parish of Sibson included the chapelry of Upton.  In 1866 Sibson and Upton became separate civil parishes.  In 1935 the civil parish of Sibson merged with the civil parishes of Upton, Sheepy Magna and Sheepy Parva to form the new civil parish of Sheepy.

The Civil War 

During the English Civil War Sibson made a number of claims for losses and "free quarter" from the local parliamentary garrisons. In June 1646, William Mousley and William King claimed for lost horses taken by soldiers from the  Tamworth garrison. Colonel Purefoy from the Coventry garrison extorted money  and "provinder". As many as 44 soldiers under the command of Colonel Cheshire from the Warwick garrison were quartered here for nearly two weeks on one occasion. Sibson is also notable as the birthplace of Peter Temple, a regicide, born here 1599 and apprenticed to a linen draper.*

Population 

The national census of 1801 records that the village had a population of 45 families, comprising 220 people, mostly employed in agriculture.

The parish Church 
An engraved illustration of the church from 1793 printed by John Nichols, shows the rectory and perhaps one of Pendock Neale’s tenants carting hay.

References

John Nichols, History and Antiquities of Leicestershire, Vol. IV, p. 954
A. Roberts, "The depredations of the Civil War in Southwest Leicestershire", Leicestershire Historian, Vol. 3 no. 4 (1985–86) pp. 3–13.

Villages in Leicestershire
Former civil parishes in Leicestershire
Hinckley and Bosworth